How It Ends is a 2021 American comedy-drama film written, directed, and produced by Daryl Wein and Zoe Lister-Jones. It stars Lister-Jones and Cailee Spaeny, with cameo appearances by 23 others in a series of vignettes, facilitating the reality of 2020 COVID-19 protocols while serving the underlying plot device of walking through the deserted streets of Los Angeles.

The film had its world premiere at the 2021 Sundance Film Festival on January 29, 2021, and was released in the United States on July 20, 2021, by United Artists Releasing.

Plot summary
On the last full day before a meteor arrives on its collision course with Earth, Liza takes stock of her life through a conversation with her "metaphysical" childhood self. The conversation carries through as they walk through the empty streets of Los Angeles to their cousin Mandy's End of the World Party. As they walk, they have short interactions with numerous individuals, including the metaphysical YS of othersthe Younger Selves who are now visible due to certain doom having elevated everyone's awareness. The Lizas also stop to visit some family, and friends, they want to see before the end.

Cast

Production
The married team of Wein and Zoe Lister-Jones, who had not yet separated at the time, reached out to numerous actor friends, and even some actors they did not know, to say "If you’re interested in starting to step outdoors in whatever fashion that may be and however energetically, we’ll meet you halfway." The couple felt that their years of experience working a free form style together helped facilitate doing so with such a large and diverse cast, over a series of numerous vignettes.

Release
The film had its world premiere at the 2021 Sundance Film Festival on January 29, 2021. It was also scheduled to screen at South by Southwest in March 2021, which ended up being a virtual SXSW festival as the COVID-19 pandemic in Austin remained troubling. In May 2021, American International Pictures acquired worldwide distribution rights to the film, and set it for a release in the United States on July 20, 2021. However, subsequent worldwide waves extended the COVID-19 pandemic through 2021, and the film was released through video-on-demand and streaming services.

Critical response
On Rotten Tomatoes, the film has an approval rating of 67% based on reviews from 73 critics, with an average rating of 6/10. The critics consensus reads: "It can feel more like a collection of skits than a cohesive story, but How It Ends is a comedic vision of the apocalypse with fleeting moments of brilliance."  On Metacritic, the film has a weighted average score of 57 out of 100, based on 17 critics, indicating "mixed or average reviews".

References

External links

2021 films
American comedy-drama films
Films directed by Zoe Lister-Jones
2021 comedy-drama films
2021 independent films
American independent films
American International Pictures films
2020s English-language films
2020s American films